Calamotropha haplorus is a moth in the family Crambidae. It was described by Alfred Jefferis Turner in 1911. It is found in Australia, where it has been recorded from the Northern Territory.

References

Crambinae
Moths described in 1911